The United States Public Health Service Building, also known as the Federal Reserve Board - East Building and formerly the Department of the Interior - South Building, is a historic government office building.  It is located at 1951 Constitution Avenue, Northwest, Washington, D.C., adjacent to the Eccles Building.

It was the headquarters of the U.S. Public Health Service during 1933–1942 and 1946–1947; at other times it was the headquarters of the Combined Chiefs of Staff, Atomic Energy Commission, and National Science Foundation.  From 1965 until 2018, it was used by the Department of the Interior, most prominently as the headquarters of the Bureau of Indian Affairs and Office of Surface Mining.  In 2018, it was transferred to the Federal Reserve Board of Governors.

History

Early history 
The site was previously home to a YWCA.

It was designed by Jules Henri de Sibour, for the Public Health Service in 1931.  The Public Health service occupied it in May 1933, moving its headquarters from the Butler Building.

During World War II, the building was occupied by the Combined Chiefs of Staff.  The Public Health Service vacated the building in February 1942, moving to a temporary building at the National Institutes of Health campus. The building was renamed to the Combined Chiefs of Staff Building on January 30, 1942.  It was the site of the planning for the Manhattan Project.  The Public Health Service then briefly reoccupied the building from January 1946 to March 1947, after which its headquarters moved to the Federal Security Building and the Federal Security Building South.

The Atomic Energy Commission occupied the site from its creation in 1947 until its relocation to Germantown, Maryland in 1958.  From August 1958 until April 1965, it was the headquarters of the National Science Foundation.

Department of the Interior 
The Bureau of Indian Affairs began using the building in April 1965, and Office of Surface Mining joined them in 1977. The building has since been used by several offices and bureaus of the Department of the Interior which is headquartered next door.

On November 3, 1972, a group of around 500 American Indians with the AIM took over the building, the culmination of their Trail of Broken Treaties walk. They intended to bring attention to American Indian issues, including their demands for renewed negotiation of treaties, enforcement of treaty rights and improvement in living standards. They occupied the Department of the Interior headquarters from November 3 to November 9, 1972.

Federal Reserve Board 
In July 2018, the building was transferred to the Federal Reserve Board of Governors, whose headquarters, the Eccles Building, is across the street to the west.  The building was planned to be renovated.  The renovation attracted attention as an early test of the Trump administration's efforts to promote neoclassical rather than modern architecture.

Architectural description
The structure is a three-story E-shaped building featuring a raised basement, shallow projecting corner pavilions, and a gabled tile roof. The structural system is composed of a concealed steel frame and concrete floors. At the east, south, and west elevations the building is surrounded by raised terrace separated from the exterior walls by an areaway. The principal exterior building materials consist of marble on the east, south, and west facades; limestone within the two courtyards; and stucco on the north facades of the east and west wings.

The primary facade is faced in white Georgia marble and features a thirteen bay, engaged double-height colonnade of fluted Doric pilasters flanked by shallow projecting corner pavilions. A large entablature composed of a plain frieze and enriched ornamental cavetto cornice surmounts these pilasters. A single-height entrance pavilion composed of three pedimented formal entryways is centered on the facade.

Notable interior spaces include an elaborate marble entrance lobby, marble stair and elevator lobbies, and an ornamental auditorium space, all of which feature decorative painted finishes on ornamental plaster and compo features. An elaborate wood panelled primary executive office suite is located on the second floor.

See also
National Register of Historic Places listings in central Washington, D.C.

References

External links

Emporis.com
https://profiles.nlm.nih.gov/ps/retrieve/ResourceMetadata/NNBCWX

Government buildings completed in 1931
Office buildings in Washington, D.C.
Public Health Service Building
Office buildings on the National Register of Historic Places in Washington, D.C.
Government buildings on the National Register of Historic Places in Washington, D.C.
1931 establishments in Washington, D.C.
United States Public Health Service